Melsonby is a village and civil parish in the Richmondshire district of North Yorkshire, England.

Etymology
The second element in the name Melsonby is the Old Norse suffix -by, meaning "farm, settlement". The first element may be the Old Irish personal name Maelsuithan, which indicates Norse-Gaelic settlement in the area.

Governance
The village lies within the Richmond (Yorks) parliamentary constituency, which has been represented since 2015 by Conservative Rishi Sunak, who took over from retiring fellow Conservative William Hague.

An electoral ward in the same name exists. This ward stretches north to Manfield with a total population taken at the 2011 Census of 1,406.

Murder of Diana Garbutt
In March 2010, village postmistress Diana Garbutt was found dead in the living quarters above the shop, after suffering severe head injuries. Her husband Robin Garbutt was charged with her murder. He was committed for trial and pleaded not guilty.
On 27 September Robin Garbutt was released on bail due to a significant breakthrough in the case against him.

On 19 April 2011, following trial at Teesside Crown Court, he was convicted of the murder of Diane Garbutt and was sentenced to life imprisonment.

See also
St James' Church, Melsonby

References

External links

Villages in North Yorkshire
Civil parishes in North Yorkshire